Rudersberg is a municipality in the Rems-Murr district, in Baden-Württemberg, Germany. It is located 10 km southeast of Backnang, and 28 km northeast of Stuttgart.

Sport
The local motocross club MSC Wieslauftal operates a track near Rudersberg which has in the past been used for Sidecarcross World Championship races. The race has been the final round of the calendar since 2005 and will do so again in 2010, on 12 September.

References

External links
 MSC Wieslauftal website

Rems-Murr-Kreis